Alberta has been a tourist destination since the early days of the 20th Century, with attractions including national parks, National Historic Sites of Canada, urban arts and cultural facilities, outdoor locales for skiing, hiking and camping, shopping locales such as West Edmonton Mall, outdoor festivals, professional athletic events, international sporting competitions such as the Commonwealth Games and Olympic Winter Games, as well as more eclectic attractions.

Overview 

Calgary and Edmonton, and larger regions Canadian Rockies (Banff National Park and Jasper National Park) are the most popular destinations for visitors. West Edmonton Mall in Edmonton is the most visited attraction in the province. Around one million visitors each year attend Calgary's Stampede, a celebration of Canada's own Wild West and the cattle ranching industry. Edmonton, known as Canada's Festival City, boasts a summer calendar of non-stop festivals, including the Edmonton International Fringe Theatre Festival and the Edmonton Folk Music Festival.

Alberta tourism is split into four large regions by the government. As of 2014; Alberta North which saw 1.81 million visits, Alberta Central in saw 8.45 million and Alberta South with 4.29 million and the Canadian Rockies with 4.35 million. As well, Calgary & Area and Edmonton & Areas encompass the two largest cities, Edmonton and Calgary and areas around them. As of 2014; Calgary & Area saw 8.27 million visits, while Edmonton & Area had 8.43 million.

Tourist attractions

Mountains
The Canadian Rockies in Alberta's southwest are a major attraction for climbing and hiking, with an extensive park system and mountain peaks reaching over 3000 m. The Kananaskis Country park system has numerous trails for hiking and horseback riding, and rafting is done on some of the rivers.

Skiing
Alberta is an important destination for tourists who love to ski. It boasts several world-class ski resorts, such as Nakiska and Fortress in Kananaskis Country, Sunshine Village, Mount Norquay and Lake Louise Mountain Resort in the Banff area or Marmot Basin near Jasper. Canada Olympic Park, with its downhill ski and ski jumping facilities, is located in the city of Calgary.

Hunting and fishing
Hunters and fishermen from around the world are able to take home impressive trophies and tall tales from their experiences in Alberta's wilderness. The Bow River is famous for fly fishing and its trout population. Many of Alberta's lakes contain amenities for fishing, such as campgrounds and boat launches.

Museums
See List of museums in Alberta.

Museums in Alberta:
 The Royal Alberta Museum, in Edmonton is the official provincial museum and largest museum in western Canada. 
 The Galt Museum & Archives is the primary museum in Lethbridge, and is the largest museum in the province south of Calgary.
 The Heritage Park Historical Village is a historical park located in Calgary. The park is located on 66 acres (267,000 m2) of parkland on the banks of the Glenmore Reservoir, along the city's southwestern edge. It is one of the city's most visited tourist attractions.
 The Michelsen Farmstead is a typical farmstead of the 1890s era, located in the National Historic Site of Canada of Stirling. It was declared a Provincial Historic Site of Alberta in 2001, and has been restored back to its original 19th century Victorian style.
  The Royal Tyrrell Museum of Palaeontology in Drumheller is the museum that earns 5 Guinness World Records (as of November 2021) including the best-preserved armoured dinosaur in the world.

National and provincial parks
 
Five national parks are located in the province of Alberta, with Banff, Jasper, Waterton Lakes and Elk Island National Park being the most popular tourist destinations. 69 provincial parks, 33 wildland provincial parks, 248 provincial recreation areas, 16 ecological reserves, 3 wilderness areas, 149 natural areas and a heritage rangeland are also protected on a provincial level.

Alberta contains five of Canada's 13 UNESCO World Heritage Sites. These are Canadian Rocky Mountain Parks (includes Banff and Jasper National Parks), Waterton-Glacier International Peace Park, Wood Buffalo National Park, Dinosaur Provincial Park and Head-Smashed-In Buffalo Jump.

Railway
Located in East-Central Alberta is Alberta Prairie Railway Excursions, a popular tourist attraction operated out of Stettler that draws visitors from around the world. It boasts one of the few operable steam trains in the world, offering trips through the rolling prairie scenery.

Another popular tourist attraction located near the National Historic Site of Canada of Stirling is the Galt Historic Railway Park A restored 1890 North West Territories International Train Station, the station has many Displays of life and travel in the 1880s. The station was moved from its former location in Coutts, Alberta, Canada, and Sweetgrass, Montana, USA border to the current location near Stirling in 2000.

Tourists also ride the Canadian, the Rocky Mountaineer, and the Royal Canadian Pacific, which are tourist-oriented passenger services which operate on scenic routes through the Canadian Rockies.

Significant events in Alberta tourism
The history of Alberta tourism events:
1885: Banff National Park established, making it the first Canadian National Park, and the world's third
1912: The Alberta Legislature Building opens;Calgary Exhibition and Stampede debuts; Alberta's first movie theatre, the Empress Theatre, opens in Fort Macleod
1921: Road from Banff to Lake Louise opens
1923: Road from Banff to Radium opens; First competitive chuckwagon races at the Calgary Stampede
1927: Prince of Wales Hotel in Waterton opens 25 Jul 1927
1932: Waterton-Glacier International Peace Park established; Going-to-the-Sun Road opens in Waterton
1936: Chinook Train begins operation between Calgary and Edmonton (now on display at the Canadian Museum of Rail Travel)
1940: First teahouse on Sulphur Mountain opens; Icefields Parkway opens
1959: Sulphur Mountain Gondola opens - the first bi-cable gondola in North America and first ever gondola in Canada; First heritage trails (walking trails with posted historical information) open in Banff, including Hoodoos and Bow Summit trails
1962: Klondike Days begin in Edmonton, as extension of the Edmonton Exhibition, itself dating back to 1879.
1967: St. Paul opens a UFO landing pad to celebrate the Centennial of Confederation
1967: The Provincial Museum of Alberta/Edmonton opens December 6 as Alberta's project for Canada's centennial (now known as the Royal Alberta Museum).
1968: Calgary Tower opens June 30
1975: Fish Creek Park established in Calgary; Ukrainian Easter Egg "Pysanka" [ statue] erected in Vegreville, commemorating the settlement of Ukrainian immigrants east of Edmonton
1977: Kananaskis Country opens
1978: Commonwealth Games held in Edmonton
1981: West Edmonton Mall opens, with Phase II and Fantasyland in 1983 and Phase III and the World Waterpark in 1985; Head-Smashed-In Buffalo Jump designated a World Heritage Site
1985: Royal Tyrrell Museum of Palaeontology opens in Drumheller; Frank Slide interpretive Centre opens April 28; Oil Sands Interpretive Centre opens in Fort McMurray
1986: The Mindbender at Galaxyland derails and kills three riders
1988: XV Olympic Winter Games held in Calgary
1990: Museum of the Regiments opened in Calgary, June 30
1991: Saamis Teepee erected in Medicine Hat; originally built for the Olympic Games in Calgary in 1988, the structure is the world's largest tepee
1995: Fantasyland changes its name to "Galaxyland" after a lawsuit from Disney
1996: Torrington Torrington Gopher Hole Museum opens
1997: Canadian Petroleum Interpretive Centre opens, honouring the occasion of the Leduc No. 1 oil well going into production on February 3, 1947; First leg of Trans-Canada Trail, the Bow Corridor Link Trail, opened on October 18; Town of Legal unveils first of 28 murals
2000: Dino 2000 opens in Drumheller as a Millennium project in August. The 8 story T-Rex sculpture incorporates a viewing platform in the head; Shaw Millennium Skate Park opens in Calgary, the world's largest public outdoor skate park.
2006: The Military Museums announced June 3, a reorganization of the former Museum of the Regiments, Naval Museum of Alberta, and elements of the Calgary Aerospace Museum.

See also 

Tourism in Canada
List of attractions and landmarks in Edmonton
List of attractions and landmarks in Calgary
List of attractions and landmarks in Stirling
List of Alberta provincial parks
Festivals in Alberta

References